Alhashem-e Olya (also Romanized as Ālhāshem-e ‘Olyā; also known as Āl-e Hāshem, Āl-e Hāshem-e Bālā, Āl Hāshem, and Alishma) is a village in Khanandabil-e Sharqi Rural District, in the Central District of Khalkhal County, Ardabil Province, Iran. At the 2006 census, its population was 307, in 62 families.

References 

Tageo

Towns and villages in Khalkhal County